Marc Fesneau (born 11 January 1971) is a French politician who has served as Minister of Agriculture and Food since 20 May 2022 in the government of Élisabeth Borne. A member of the Democratic Movement (MoDem), he previously represented the 1st constituency of the Loir-et-Cher department and presided over the Democratic Movement and affiliated group in the National Assembly from 2017 to 2018.

Fesneau also served as Minister for Relations with Parliament under Prime Minister Édouard Philippe from 2018 until 2020, when his portfolio was expanded in the newly-appointed government of Jean Castex to include citizen participation.

Political career

Early career
First elected to the municipal council of Marchenoir, Loir-et-Cher in 1995, Fesneau assumed the mayorship in 2008. He served as a regional councillor in Centre from 2004 to 2010. In 2009, he was selected to be the Democratic Movement's candidate in Centre for the 2010 regional election, in which the list he led placed sixth. He failed to be reelected regional councillor.

In 2010, Fesneau was appointed secretary-general of the Democratic Movement. François Bayrou included Fesneau in his shadow cabinet; in this capacity, he served as opposition counterpart to Minister of Agriculture Bruno Le Maire. In 2017, Fesneau became party vice president.

Member of the National Assembly, 2017–2018
In the 2017 legislative election, Fesneau was elected to the National Assembly. He was subsequently unanimously elected to the presidency of the MoDem group in the National Assembly on 25 June; though Marielle de Sarnez had initially announced her intent to run, she ultimately decided not to. He also served as member of the Committee on National Defence and Armed Forces (2017–2018) and the Committee on Legal Affairs (2018). In this capacity, he was his parliamentary group's rapporteur on constitutional reforms.

In September 2018, following François de Rugy's appointment to the government, Fesneau ran for the presidency of the National Assembly. He placed third behind Annie Genevard of The Republicans and Richard Ferrand of La République En Marche!, who was elected with 254 votes.

Career in government, 2018–present
In October 2018, Fesneau was appointed Minister for Relations with Parliament in the government of Prime Minister Édouard Philippe under the direct leadership of Philippe. He was replaced by his substitute Stéphane Baudu in the National Assembly. Upon the inauguration of the government of Jean Castex in July 2020, the citizen participation portfolio was added to his title, which was changed to minister delegate.

In the 2021 regional election in Centre-Val de Loire (Centre until 2015), Fesneau led the MoDem list supported by La République En Marche! and Agir, which placed fifth. He regained a seat in the regional council, where he took the presidency of the MoDem group.

In May 2022, Fesneau succeeded Julien Denormandie as Minister of Agriculture and Food under Prime Minister Élisabeth Borne. In June 2022, he ran for reelection to his seat in Loir-et-Cher and won.

References

1971 births
Living people
Union for French Democracy politicians
Democratic Movement (France) politicians
Deputies of the 15th National Assembly of the French Fifth Republic
Sciences Po alumni
Politicians from Paris
Politicians from Centre-Val de Loire
Mayors of places in Centre-Val de Loire
Regional councillors of France
Deputies of the 16th National Assembly of the French Fifth Republic
Members of the Borne government